The Sri Lanka provincial council elections, 2009 were held on February 14, 2009 to elect members to Sri Lanka’s Central Provincial Council and North Western Provincial Council. The 2 councils were dissolved by their respective governors at midnight on December 8, 2008. The Elections Commission subsequently accepted nominations from December 24 to December 31, and set the date for the polls.

A total of 1,746,449 people were eligible to vote in the Central Province, along with 1,661,733 in the North Western Province. They elected 56 and 50 members for the councils respectively. By the close of nominations, 1320 candidates from 15 political parties and 26 independent groups registered to contest the Central Provincial Council, and 937 candidates from 15 political parties and 17 independent groups filed nominations for the North Western Provincial Council.

Buoyed by support for his handling of the Sri Lankan Civil War, Sri Lankan President Mahinda Rajapakse's United People's Freedom Alliance achieved resounding victories in all 5 districts. This included the districts of Kandy and Nuwara Eliya, which are traditionally seen as strongholds of the opposition United National Party.

Past elections
In the last election held to elect members to the Central Provincial Council, the United People's Freedom Alliance secured a majority in the council, obtaining 426,297 votes and 30 seats as opposed to 410,145 votes and 26 seats for the United National Party. The UPFA also secured a majority in the North Western Provincial Council, obtaining 491,000 votes and 31 seats with 311,773 votes and 19 seats going to the UNP.

Contesting political parties

Parties contesting in all 5 districts

Parties contesting in 4 districts

Parties contesting in 3 districts

Parties contesting in 2 districts

Parties contesting in only 1 districts

* - indicates nominations were submitted, but rejected by the Elections Commission

Results

Central Province

|-
! style="background-color:#E9E9E9;text-align:center;" colspan="2" rowspan="2" | Party
! style="background-color:#E9E9E9;text-align:center;" colspan="2" | Kandy
! style="background-color:#E9E9E9;text-align:center;" colspan="2" | Matale
! style="background-color:#E9E9E9;text-align:center;" colspan="2" | Nuwara Eliya
! style="background-color:#E9E9E9;text-align:center;" colspan="3" | Seats
! style="background-color:#E9E9E9;text-align:center;" colspan="2" | Popular Vote
|-
! style="background-color:#E9E9E9;text-align:right;" | Votes
! style="background-color:#E9E9E9;text-align:right;" | Seats
! style="background-color:#E9E9E9;text-align:right;" | Votes
! style="background-color:#E9E9E9;text-align:right;" | Seats
! style="background-color:#E9E9E9;text-align:right;" | Votes
! style="background-color:#E9E9E9;text-align:right;" | Seats
! style="background-color:#E9E9E9;text-align:right;" | 2004
! style="background-color:#E9E9E9;text-align:right;" | 2009
! style="background-color:#E9E9E9;text-align:right;" | +/−
! style="background-color:#E9E9E9;text-align:right;" | Vote
! style="background-color:#E9E9E9;text-align:right;" | %
|-
| style="background-color:"| 
| style="text-align: left" | United People's Freedom Alliance
| 363,490
| 18
| 140,295
| 7
| 146,418
| 9
| 30
| 36
| +6
| style="text-align:right;" | 650,203 
| 59.53%
|-
| style="background-color:"| 
| style="text-align: left" | United National Party
| 237,827
| 12
| 56,009
| 3
| 128,289
| 7
| 26
| 22
| −4
| style="text-align:right;" | 422,125 
| 38.65%
|-
! colspan=2 style="text-align:left;" | Total
| 643,617
| 30
| 218,406
| 10
| 309,666
| 16
| 58
| 58
| 0
| style="text-align:right;" | 1,167,336 
| 100%

|-
! style=text-align:left colspan=13|Voter turnout:   66.84%

|-
| style="background-color: #e9e9e9; text-align: left; border-right: none; font-size: smaller" colspan="13" | Source: Sri Lanka Department of Elections
Notes:
1. Includes 2 bonus seats
|}

North Western Province

|-
! style="background-color:#E9E9E9;text-align:center;" colspan="2" rowspan="2" | Party
! style="background-color:#E9E9E9;text-align:center;" colspan="2" | Kurunegala
! style="background-color:#E9E9E9;text-align:center;" colspan="2" | Puttalam
! style="background-color:#E9E9E9;text-align:center;" colspan="3" | Seats
! style="background-color:#E9E9E9;text-align:center;" colspan="2" | Popular Vote
|-
! style="background-color:#E9E9E9;text-align:right;" | Votes
! style="background-color:#E9E9E9;text-align:right;" | Seats
! style="background-color:#E9E9E9;text-align:right;" | Votes
! style="background-color:#E9E9E9;text-align:right;" | Seats
! style="background-color:#E9E9E9;text-align:right;" | 2004
! style="background-color:#E9E9E9;text-align:right;" | 2009
! style="background-color:#E9E9E9;text-align:right;" | +/−
! style="background-color:#E9E9E9;text-align:right;" | Vote
! style="background-color:#E9E9E9;text-align:right;" | %
|-
| style="background-color:"| 
| style="text-align: left" | United People's Freedom Alliance
| 497,366
| 24
| 171,377
| 11
| 31
| 37
| +6
| style="text-align:right;" | 668,743 
| 69.43%
|-
| style="background-color:"| 
| style="text-align: left" | United National Party
| 193,548
| 9
| 76,799
| 5
| 19
| 14
| −5
| style="text-align:right;" | 270,347 
| 28.07%
|-
| style="background-color:"| 
| style="text-align: left" | Janatha Vimukthi Peramuna
| 16,084
| 1
| 4,344
| 0
| 0
| 1
| +1
| style="text-align:right;" | 20,428 
| 2.12%
|-
! colspan=2 style="text-align:left;" | Total
| 735,846
| 34
| 274,014
| 16
| 52
| 52
| 0
| style="text-align:right;" | 1,009,860 
| 100%

|-
! style=text-align:left colspan=11|Voter turnout:   60.77%

|-
| style="background-color: #e9e9e9; text-align: left; border-right: none; font-size: smaller" colspan="11" | Source: Sri Lanka Department of Elections
Notes:
1. Includes 2 bonus seats
2. Contested in 2004 as part of the UPFA
|}

See also
Sri Lanka Provincial Council elections, 2008/09

References

External links
Sri Lanka Election Results
Central Provincial Council
North Western Provincial Council
Department of Elections, Sri Lanka 

2008–2009 Sri Lankan provincial council elections